Mathwin is a surname. Notable people with the surname include:

Henry Mathwin (1852–1911), English schoolmaster and cricketer
John Mathwin (1919–2004), Australian politician